Orville O. Dull (April 25, 1888 – December 29, 1978) was an American producer, director, production manager and assistant director. He was best known for his films produced for Metro-Goldwyn-Mayer. Dull was nominated during the 6th Academy Awards for the short lived Best Assistant Director category.  He won the Oscar for Best Documentary Feature in the 1948 Oscars for the film The Secret Land. He worked on over 40 films from 1925 to 1951.

Selected filmography

The Secret Land (1948) (producer)
Bad Bascomb (1946) (producer)
Barbary Coast Gent (1944) (producer)
Rationing (1944) (producer)
The Man from Down Under (1943) (producer)
Stand By for Action (1942) (producer)
Tish (1942) (producer)
We Were Dancing (1942) (producer)
When Ladies Meet (1941) (producer)
Edison, the Man (1940)  (associate producer) 
Young Tom Edison (1940) (associate producer)
Boys Town (1938) (uncredited production associate) 
Vacation from Love (1938) (producer)
Saratoga (1937) (uncredited assistant to producer)
Abraham Lincoln (1930) (production manager - as O.O. Dull) 
Du Barry, Woman of Passion (1930) (production manager) 
The Lottery Bride (1930) (production manager - as O.O. Dull) 
Black Jack (1927) (producer and director - as Orville Dull)
The Broncho Twister (1927) (director and producer - as Orville Dull) 
The Flying Horseman (1926) (producer and director - as Orville Dull)

References

External links
 

1888 births
1978 deaths
People from Lima, Ohio
Directors of Best Documentary Feature Academy Award winners
Film directors from Ohio
Film producers from Ohio